Ricky Brown (born March 29, 1955)  is a retired American basketball player who played collegiately for the Crimson Tide of the University of Alabama and was selected by the Portland Trail Blazers in the third round (63rd pick overall) of the 1977 NBA draft. He played professionally  for the Harlem Globetrotters and Hapoel Jerusalem of the Israeli National League (1986–88).

References

External links
sports-reference profile
Israel Basketball Superleague profile 

1955 births
Living people
Basketball players from Alabama
American men's basketball players
Centers (basketball)
American expatriate basketball people in Israel
Harlem Globetrotters players
Alabama Crimson Tide men's basketball players
Hapoel Jerusalem B.C. players